Union Academy Senior Secondary School, New Delhi is located in Raja Bajar, New Delhi area of India.  Former Indian hockey coach Rajinder Singh was a coach of this school's field hockey team. I

References

External links
 Hindu.com
 Indianexpress.com
 News.oneindia.in

High schools and secondary schools in Delhi
New Delhi